Adu is an unclassified Loloish language of Huaning County, Yunnan, China.

Classification
Pelkey (2011:431) suggests that the neighboring Xiqi, Ati, and Long languages of Huaning County may be Southeastern Loloish languages. Hsiu (2018) also suggests a Southeastern Loloish affiliation.

Distribution
The Huaning County Gazetteer 华宁县志 (1994:514) lists the following locations of Adu.
Qinglong Town 青龙镇: Songzichang 松子场, Xinzhai 新寨, Douju 斗居, Chengmendong 城门洞, Niuqiduo 牛期多
Lufeng Township 禄丰乡: Gele 革勒

Vocabulary
The Huaning County Ethnic Gazetteer (1992:72) provides a short word list of Adu, Ati, Xiqi, Nong, and Azhe transcribed using Chinese characters, shown below. Pinyin transliterations have also been provided below.

References

Loloish languages
Languages of China